Dominique Raimbourg (born 28 April 1950) was a member of the National Assembly of France.  He represented Loire-Atlantique's 4th constituency from 2001 to 2002 and again from 2007 to 2017, as a member of the Socialiste, radical, citoyen et divers gauche.

References

1950 births
Living people
Deputies of the 11th National Assembly of the French Fifth Republic
Deputies of the 13th National Assembly of the French Fifth Republic
Deputies of the 14th National Assembly of the French Fifth Republic